Griggsville Township is located in Pike County, Illinois. As of the 2010 census, its population was 1,430 and it contained 671 housing units.

History
Griggsville Township was named for Richard Griggs.

Geography

Demographics

References

External links
City-data.com
Illinois State Archives

Townships in Pike County, Illinois
Townships in Illinois